Community Charter School of Cambridge is a charter school located in Cambridge, Massachusetts, United States. Located in the Kendall Square area near MIT, the school serves 360 students in grades 6-12. CCSC opened in September 2005. Since 2009, when CCSC graduated its first class, 100% of seniors have been admitted to college, with over 90% to four-year schools including Boston College, Bucknell University, Cornell University, Columbia University, Dartmouth College, Northeastern University, UMass Boston, University of Chicago, Stanford University, and Massachusetts Institute of Technology. In 2013, 100% of CCSC 10th graders scored advanced or proficient on the ELA MCAS. In 2012, 100% of 10th graders at CCSC scored advanced or proficient on both the math and English MCAS tests, earning the school a #1 ranking statewide. In 2011, CCSC was 1 of 14 charter schools in the U.S. to be awarded an EPIC grant for attaining the highest gains in student achievement.

Enrollment is by lottery. Each year, CCSC holds public, blind lotteries to fill available seats in the 6th, 7th, 8th, 9th, and 10th grades. While a portion of the seats is reserved for students living in Cambridge, the CCSC student body also includes students from Boston, Somerville and many other towns in the Greater Boston area.

History
The school was initially scheduled to open in the fall of 2005 with grades 7 and 8. It was to receive 180 students, with 150 being from Cambridge. Paula Evans, a former headmaster of the Cambridge Rindge & Latin School, co-founded the school with Emma Stellman, formerly a physics teacher from Cambridge Rindge & Latin, and Rob Riordan, a co-founder of High Tech High and former faculty member at Cambridge Rindge & Latin.

The school had a controversial start. Before it was granted a charter from the Massachusetts Department of Elementary and Secondary Education, the Cambridge Public Schools superintendent and members of the school committee of the Cambridge Public Schools (CPS) asked Evans to halt her project. Nancy Walser, a board member of CPS at the time, said that some members of the charter school board had resigned by February 2004 and that opponents to the charter school passed the information along but never pressured people.

In August 2005 Evans said that the school had 180 slots and had received 440 applications. Most of the students were from Cambridge while other students were mostly from Boston and other communities in Greater Boston. Of the students, 40-50% were to participate in the school's free and reduced lunch program.

Academics

All students have a faculty advisor whom they see daily and meet within long blocks twice a week.

All new students are required to attend a month-long Summer Academy to familiarize them with the school’s academic and behavioral expectations and policies. Students in 6th through 8th grade complete on average 1.5 hours of homework per night, and high school students complete 3–4 hours of homework per night. Extra help is available to all students three days a week in the After School Learning Center, supervised by CCSC teachers and volunteer tutors. All students are expected to read for "pleasure" for at least 30 minutes several times a week.

All courses are designed by CCSC faculty in accordance with the Massachusetts State Frameworks, and using the MCAS examinations to inform the curriculum and required texts. All high school students are required to complete a core curriculum that includes, at a minimum: 4 credits of math, 4 of English, 3 of history, 3 of science, and 2 of Spanish. Students may elect to take visual arts courses as well. In addition, all students participate in DEAR (Drop Everything and Read, a school-wide silent reading period 4 times a week), Wellness and Movement (physical education), and daily grade-level meetings.

Advanced Placement (AP) courses are offered in biology, calculus, chemistry, computer science, and English, and all high school courses offer the option of earning honors credit. Juniors and seniors take a College Seminar to help them prepare for college admission. The college counseling department works with students and their families beginning in 9th grade and then individually in 11th and 12th grades to help them navigate the standardized testing, admission, and financial aid process.

A hallmark of the CCSC experience is the Senior Internship Program, which is a requirement for graduation. From the beginning of February through the end of May, every senior spends one full day a week interning for a local business or non-profit. Organizations that have sponsored CCSC senior interns include: Google, Akamai, Massachusetts General Hospital, Boston Medical Center, The Museum of Science, Massachusetts Institute of Technology, Northeastern University, Tufts University, the Harvard Square Business Association, and Margaret Fuller House.

CCSC has a dress code featuring red and black school colors.

Athletics

CCSC is a member of the Massachusetts Charter School Athletic Organization. The MCSAO provides opportunities for charter schools, students/athletes, to compete at a high level and uses that competition to teach the fundamental values of teamwork, discipline, sacrifice, and sportsmanship. CCSC offers the following varsity teams for high school students: boys and girls soccer (fall), boys and girls basketball (winter), softball, lacrosse, and track (spring). The school mascot is the Cougar.

The mission of the Athletics Department at CCSC is to offer students opportunities to foster mental and physical development, encourage teamwork, enhance leadership skills, promote health and wellness, and place continued emphasis on community relations within and around the school. Varsity teams, clubs, and Wellness and Movement classes provide a variety of sports and activities that give every student an opportunity to engage in an environment that offers competition, collaboration, and the potential for confidence building, increased motivation, improved focus, and character development.

Extracurricular activities and clubs

CCSC offers a variety of after-school programs and student-organized clubs for students to pursue extracurricular interests, develop leadership skills, and build community. Among the offerings are chorus, step dance, robotics, student council, mock trial, yearbook, and art.

Leadership

CCSC was co-founded by Paula Evans, a veteran educator and a former principal of Cambridge Rindge and Latin School, Emma Stellman, a former physics teacher from Cambridge Rindge & Latin School and Rob Riordan, a co-founder of High Tech High and former faculty member at Cambridge Rindge & Latin School. Evans was head of school for its first seven years. Caleb Hurst-Hiller, a founding teacher and the upper school principal from 2009 to 2012, became CCSC’s second head of school in 2012-13. Becki Norris, a founding teacher, and middle school principal became head of school in 2019.

Resources and funding

As a public charter school, CCSC is closely overseen by the state but independently operated. CCSC is funded by allocating a portion of the education spending from the sending school districts. CCSC augments these public resources with donations and grants from foundations, businesses, and individuals through its 501(c)(3), Options for Cambridge Students, Inc.

Notable alumni
 Dzhokhar Tsarnaev - Attended the middle school program, withdrawn in grade 9

References

External links

 Education in Cambridge, Massachusetts
 Public high schools in Massachusetts
 Public middle schools in Massachusetts
 Charter schools in Massachusetts
 Charter middle schools in the United States
 Charter high schools in the United States
2005 establishments in Massachusetts